Lake R'Kiz or Rkiz is a lake in southern Mauritania with an area of 12,970 ha.

Ecology
Since the lake is fed by surplus water from the Senegal River, during the rainy season it can increase to a maximum length of 34 km and a width of up to 8 km, while the water level can fluctuate by as much as 4.29 m.

In the marshland along its fringes, Phragmite and Typha reeds are growing, which are cut for thatching. Several species of birds are present, as are numerous snakes and small mammals such as otters and mongoose. Slender-snouted crocodiles can also be found.

Economy
The lake has been used for fishing, but agriculture is also prevalent.
Although the region has seen several agriculture projects aimed at benefiting farmers both by the Islamic Development Bank and The Food Crisis Prevention Network, like elsewhere in Mauritania,  significant portions of the local population continued to suffer from living conditions comparable to modern slavery.

References

R'Kiz